Forest Township is an inactive township in Holt County, in the U.S. state of Missouri.

Forest Township was erected in 1890, and named for the forests within its borders.

References

Townships in Missouri
Townships in Holt County, Missouri